Austrolestes minjerriba is an Australian species of damselfly in the family Lestidae,
commonly known as a dune ringtail. 
It is found in coastal areas of northern New South Wales and southern Queensland where it inhabits acidic dune lakes and swamps.

Austrolestes minjerriba is a medium-sized to large damselfly, the male is light blue and black.

Gallery

See also
 List of Odonata species of Australia

References 

Lestidae
Odonata of Australia
Insects of Australia
Endemic fauna of Australia
Taxa named by J.A.L. (Tony) Watson
Insects described in 1979
Damselflies